The 2011 PEI Labatt Tankard was held February 3–8 at the Silver Fox Curling Club in Summerside, Prince Edward Island.  The winning team of Eddie MacKenzie will represent Prince Edward Island at the 2011 Tim Hortons Brier in London, Ontario.

Teams

Standings

A Event

B Event

C Event

Playoffs

Championship Round 1
February 8, 2:00 PM

Championship Round 2
February 8, 7:00 PM

References

Labatt Tankard, 2011
Sport in Summerside, Prince Edward Island
Curling competitions in Prince Edward Island
2011 in Prince Edward Island